{{DISPLAYTITLE:C2H6O3S}}
The molecular formula C2H6O3S (molar mass: 110.13 g/mol, exact mass: 110.0038 u) may refer to:

 Dimethyl sulfite
 Ethanesulfonic acid (esylic acid)
 Methyl methanesulfonate